I Am That Change is a 2014 Indian Telugu-language short film directed by Sukumar and produced by actor Allu Arjun on Geetha Arts. Apart from Allu Arjun, the short film features an ensemble cast of Tanishq Reddy, Vikram Chaitanya, Surya Ashrith, Trisha, Sri Varshini and Bharath Reddy. Amol Rathod is the cinematographer, while Prawin Pudi is the editor.

The short film released on 14 August 2014 around 8:30 PM, a day before the 68th Independence Day of India as a tribute to the day. Upon its release, the short film received viral response online and was acclaimed by many including celebrities for its concept and execution. It was also screened in theaters which received similar response from the audience. Few days later its release, Allu Arjun received flak from his fans following an online video in which he is seen skipping a drunk-and-drive test and arguing with policemen which is contrary to message given in the short film. However he clarified that he took the test and was let go.

Plot
A rich brat (Tanishq Reddy) answers a call and continues to drive his car against the rules. When a traffic constable stops him, the man offers a bribe of 500. On a parallel note, a student is unable to write her exams, and her friend offers her an additional sheet for copying the answers. On another note, a kid drinks a cool drink and drops the paper cup near a dust bin and walks away with his father only to halt after a small distance. On the other hand, Allu Arjun attends a public meeting without allowing the security to check him.

However, Allu Arjun soon realizes his mistake, and lets the security check him. Then, there is a realization from the traffic constable, who fines Tanishq Reddy. The boy also realizes his mistake and drops the cup in the dustbin. The girl in the examination refuses to copy the answers from the additional sheet, and they do their duties without indulging in corruption and anti-socialism. The short film ends with Allu Arjun conveying the message, "Performing one's duty is a form of patriotism. Change begins with us. I am that change. Be that change", with the other three saying, "I am that change".

References

Indian short films
2014 films
2014 short films
Films directed by Sukumar
Geetha Arts films
2010s Telugu-language films
Films scored by Sai Karthik